Bern Wankdorf railway station is a railway station in the municipality of Bern, in the Swiss canton of Bern.

Layout 
Bern Wankdorf is an example of a keilbahnhof; the various lines converge west of the station, and it has separate north and south platforms. In the south, adjacent to Max-Dätwyler-Platz, are an island platform and a side platform, serving tracks 1–3. Track 4 is reserved for future expansion. These platforms serve trains on the Bern–Thun line. In the north are another island platform and side platform, serving tracks 5–7. These platforms serve trains on the Biel/Bienne–Bern and Olten–Bern lines.

History 
The station was expanded between 2016–2023 as part of the Wylerfeld "unbundling" project, which created a new flying junction for the Bern–Thun line directly west of the station. Another station platform and track were built to accommodate planned additional service, with room for yet another track on the south side of the station.

Services 
The following services stop at Bern Wankdorf:

 Bern S-Bahn:
 : rush-hour service between Belp and Biel/Bienne.
 : hourly service between Thun and Langnau.

References

External links 
 
 

Railway stations in the canton of Bern
Swiss Federal Railways stations
Buildings and structures in Bern